Arnond Vongvanij (born 15 December 1988) is a Thai professional golfer.

Vongvanij was born in Hawaii but grew up in Thailand. He moved to Florida at the age of 12 to play golf. He played college golf at the University of Florida where he won three times.

Vongvanij turned professional in 2011 and began playing on the Asian Tour. He won his first title at the 2012 King's Cup.

Amateur wins
2005 St. Augustine Amateur Classic
2006 Terra Cotta Invitational
2009 Eastern Amateur

Professional wins (1)

Asian Tour wins (1)

Asian Tour playoff record (0–1)

U.S. national team appearances
Amateur
Palmer Cup: 2011 (winners)

References

External links

University of Florida Gators profile

Arnond Vongvanij
Florida Gators men's golfers
Asian Tour golfers
Golfers from Hawaii
Arnond Vongvanij
Sportspeople from Bradenton, Florida
1988 births
Living people